Bardelys the Magnificent is a 1906 historical adventure novel by the Italian-born British writer Rafael Sabatini. It is set in France during the reign of Louis XIII.

In 1926 the story was adapted into a film version Bardelys the Magnificent by the Hollywood studio MGM, with John Gilbert playing the title role.

References

Bibliography
 Golden, Eve. John Gilbert: The Last of the Silent Film Stars. University Press of Kentucky, 2013.

External links

1906 British novels
British historical novels
British adventure novels
Novels set in the 17th century
Novels set in France
Novels by Rafael Sabatini
British novels adapted into films
Cultural depictions of Louis XIII